{
  "type": "ExternalData",
  "service": "geoline",
  "ids": "Q7171630",
  "properties": {
    "stroke": "#FFCC00",
    "stroke-width": 6
  }
}
The Petaling Jaya City Council (abbreviated MBPJ) is the city council which administers the city of Petaling Jaya in the state of Selangor, Malaysia. This council was established after the city was officially granted city status on 20 June 2006. Their jurisdiction covers an area of 97 square kilometres.

The council consists of the mayor plus twenty-four councillors appointed to serve a one-year term by the Selangor State Government. MBPJ is responsible for public health and sanitation, waste removal and management, town planning, environmental protection and building control, social and economic development and general maintenance functions of urban infrastructure.

History 
In the early 1950s, Kuala Lumpur experienced congestion as a result of a rapid population growth and squatters existing in the outskirts of Kuala Lumpur. To overcome this problem, the State Government identified "Effingham Estate", a 1,200-acre rubber plantation in Jalan Klang Lama to create a new settlement known as Petaling Jaya.

The party entrusted to govern the new settlement was the District Officer of Kuala Lumpur and Petaling Jaya Board before being taken over by a statutory body, namely Petaling Jaya Authority at the end of 1954.

Petaling Jaya made history on 1 January 1964 when the Selangor State gazetted a Township Board with financial autonomy to govern the city.

On 1 January 1977, Petaling Jaya Town Authority was upgraded to Petaling Jaya Municipal Council (MPPJ), pursuant to the Local Government Act 1976 by the government. On 20 June 2006, Petaling Jaya Municipal Council was upgraded as Petaling Jaya City Council.

Now, the administrative area of MBPJ is 97.2 square kilometres which is rapidly growing. Petaling Jaya has a total population of over 619,925 people and the number of property holding of 217,930. Petaling Jaya is now known as the leading growth centre in Selangor.

The Administrative Council consists of 25 Councillors led by a mayor. Councillors are appointed by the Selangor State Executive Council. The Mayor is an officer of the Federal Government appointed by the state administration after obtaining the consent of the Menteri Besar. A mayor works full-time, assisted by a Deputy Mayor and Head of the Departments in setting and implementing the vision, mission, quality policy, objectives and activities of the Council. The Council approved a Council legislation draft and forming policies to be implemented by the departments.

Appointed president & mayors of Petaling Jaya
Since 1977, the Municipal & city has been led by four mayors. The previous and incumbent mayors are listed as below:

Current appointed councillors

2021/2022 Session

Departments

Customer Management
Treasury
Development Planning
Engineering
Health and Environmental Service
Asset Management and Valuation
Building Control
Community Development
Enforcement
Landscape
Licensing
Solid Waste Management and Public Sanitary
Legal
Corporate Communication
Internal Audit and Integrity
One Stop Centre Unit
Commissioner of Building Unit
Information Technology

Administration Area
Below are the administration area for MBPJ which further breakdown into 24 zones.

Past appointed councillors

2018/2020 Session

Sports
MBPJ FC

References

External links 

Petaling Jaya
Local government in Selangor
City councils in Malaysia